Olda Žák (3 November 1900 – 21 December 1983) was a Czech sculptor. His work was part of the art competitions at the 1932 Summer Olympics and the 1936 Summer Olympics.

References

1900 births
1983 deaths
20th-century Czech sculptors
Czech male sculptors
Olympic competitors in art competitions
Artists from Prague